(lit. 'chicken broth') is a common Latin American soup that consists of chicken and vegetables.

What makes this soup different from many other versions of chicken soup is that alike the Brazilian ,  uses whole chicken pieces instead of chopped or shredded chicken. Other differences are that the vegetables are usually of a heartier cut. Potato halves, not cubes, are used, and whole leaves of cabbage are added.

A typical recipe for  will include the following: first garlic boiled in water, adding chicken pieces (drumsticks, breasts, thighs), sliced carrots, sliced celery, potato halves, garbanzo beans, corn on the cob, diced tomato, sliced onion, minced cilantro, and cabbage.

While it is common to eat  plain, most add lemon juice or hot sauce. Some recipes call for cubed avocado added just before eating.  can also be served with hot corn tortillas. In Mexico it is also common to add steamed or Mexican rice in the same bowl while serving, especially at fondas. In other Latin American countries, it is called  and not , which means literally soup instead of broth.

Many Latin American countries, particularly Mexico, use this home-cooked meal during illness as a means to the healing of cold viruses, and after a woman gives birth, though in other cultures the recipe for this is significantly lighter than the traditional Mexican dish.

See also
 Canja de galinha
 List of Mexican dishes
 List of soups

References

Mexican soups
Chicken soups
Mexican chicken dishes